Pierre Crabitès (1877–1943) was an American historian.

Life 

Pierre Crabitès was born in the French Quarter of New Orleans, Louisiana on 17 February 1877. He was of Creole descent. His father was a wealthy French immigrant.

He died in 1943.

Career 

He received his MA degree from Tulane University in 1895. He received his LL.B. degree from Loyola University in 1898. He received his LL.D. degree from University of New Orleans in 1918. He then commenced his graduate study at the University of Paris.

He was admitted to the Louisiana bar in 1900. In 1911, President William H. Taft appointed him as the American representative on the Mixed Courts of Egypt in Cairo, Egypt.

Bibliography 

Some of his books are:

 The Winning of the Sudan 
 Gordon, the Sudan and Slavery
 Ibrahim of Egypt 
 Clement VII & Henry VIII 
 Americans in the Egyptian Army
 Ismail the Maligned Khedive
 Victoria's Guardian Angel A Study of Baron Stockmar
 Unhappy Spain
 ''Benes Statesman of Central Europe'

References

External links

Pierre Crabitès Collection at the Earl K. Long Library, University of New Orleans

1877 births
1943 deaths
American historians
Tulane University alumni